Beaver Lake in Halifax, Nova Scotia may refer to one of the following lakes:

 Beaver Lake at 
 Beaver Lake at 
 Beaver Lake at 
 Beaver Lake at 
 Beaver Lake at 
 Beaver Lake at

See also
 Beaver Lake 17 a Mi'kmaq reserve in Halifax County

References
Geographical Names Board of Canada
Explore HRM
Nova Scotia Placenames

Landforms of Halifax, Nova Scotia
Lakes of Nova Scotia
Landforms of Halifax County, Nova Scotia